Roman Rutkowski (born 28 May 1946) is a Polish sailor. He competed in the Tempest event at the 1972 Summer Olympics.

References

External links
 

1946 births
Living people
Polish male sailors (sport)
Olympic sailors of Poland
Sailors at the 1972 Summer Olympics – Tempest
Sportspeople from Szczecin